Ocean Conservancy (founded as The Delta Corporation) is a nonprofit environmental advocacy group based in Washington, D.C., United States. The organization formulates ocean policy at the federal and state government levels based on peer-reviewed science.

About
The Ocean Conservancy promotes healthy and diverse ocean ecosystems and opposes practices that threaten oceanic and human life. Through several program areas, Ocean Conservancy advocates for protecting special marine habitats, restoring sustainable fisheries, reducing the human impact on ocean ecosystems and managing U.S. ocean resources. Ocean Conservancy is a tax-exempt non-profit organization. It meets the Better Business Bureau's 20 Standards for Charity Accountability.

History
The Ocean Conservancy was founded in 1972 to promote healthy and safe ocean ecosystems and to help prevent things that threaten oceanic and human life. The conservancy's main concern was to restore sustainable American fisheries and protect wildlife from human impact.

Previous names
 Delta Corporation (1972 to mid-1970s)
 Center for Environmental Education (mid-1970s to 1989)
 Center for Marine Conservation (1989–2001)
 Ocean Conservancy (2001–Present)

Accomplishments

Fisheries
After a four-year advocacy effort, Ocean Conservancy helped enact a Congressional rewrite of the Magnuson–Stevens Fishery Conservation and Management Act in 1996, which changed how fisheries are managed. It remains the nation's primary fisheries law.

Before 1996, the law contained no provisions to stop overfishing or require the rebuilding of fish stocks. There was no prohibition of bycatch when fish and animals are caught unintentionally by fishing gear or nets targeting specific species. Nor was there a directive to protect fish habitats. Ocean Conservancy lobbied successfully to close these loopholes and establish more sustainable fishing practices.

Marine mammals
Ocean Conservancy aims to protect marine mammals and their habitats. In 1979, the organization established the Seal Rescue Fund (SRF) to protect marine mammals from commercial exploitation. Its efforts to ban whaling resulted in the International Whaling Commission adopting an international moratorium on commercial whaling in 1982. In 1984, Ocean Conservancy led efforts against the U.S.-sanctioned fur seal hunt by blocking the renewal of the North Pacific Fur Seal Treaty in the Pribilof Islands, as well as efforts to protect dolphins from the tuna industry. Ocean Conservancy also assisted in the creation of the dolphin-safe tuna-labeling program.

Sea turtles
Ocean Conservancy's effort for sea turtles, which resulted in the requirement for turtle excluder devices (TEDs) in shrimp trawl gear, saves thousands of turtles each year. Ocean Conservancy's Sea Turtle Rescue Fund appealed directly to shrimpers to voluntarily address the problem of sea turtles drowning in their nets.

Ocean Conservancy played a major role in derailing proposals to reopen international trade in sea turtle products and in ending Japanese imports of Hawksbill sea turtle shells.

Coral reef protection and Marine Sanctuaries programs

Ocean Conservancy is attempting to restore coral reefs through coral tree nurseries and research as part of the Recovery Plan with the NOAA. The coral is very sensitive to changes in water temperature and quality caused by global warming, and many times these changes result in reef disease and death. The Ocean Conservancy informs the public of the problems plaguing reefs and other marine ecosystems through its website and magazine. A staff of senior scientists and policy experts urge policymakers to encourage implementing policies regarding mitigation, adaptation, and alternatives to damaging activities such as using carbon-based fuels.

International Coastal Cleanup 

One of the Ocean Conservancy's concerns involves setting up ocean cleanups, an event where volunteers can gather to remove trash from their local oceans. Their main event is the International Coastal Cleanup, a day where over 150 countries gather to clean up beaches and oceans. The movement was created by Linda Maraniss and Kathy O'Hara in 1986 when they organized the Ocean Conservancy's first local cleanup event. Since this first cleanup, Ocean Conservancy has helped to pick up over 300 million pounds of trash from the ocean. Scientists have confirmed that about 8 million metric tons of plastic are added to oceans yearly, prompting the International Coastal Cleanup to take place and expand yearly.To easily track the trash being picked up, Ocean Conservancy launched an app called Clean Swell in 2015. The user can log and photograph the trash they pick up, and the information is then sent to Ocean Conservancy's global trash database.

Protecting Arctic Marine Wildlife From an Oil Spill 
Over the years, vessel traffic to the northern Arctic region has drastically increased as the ice recesses and shipping channels remain ice-free for longer periods throughout the year. This increased vessel traffic creates an increased risk of spills. Alaska Chadux̂ Network (ACN) has continuously pioneered and refined solutions to reduce the risk of marine oil spills. In protecting the marine wildlife that inhabits this pristine marine and coastal ecosystem from a potential vessel oil spill,  ACN and the Alaska SeaLife Center (ASLC) have recently established an agreement to implement a program that would respond to an oil spill impacting marine mammals—like sea otters, seals and sea lions—throughout Western Alaska, the U.S. Arctic and Prince William Sound. The Agreement includes funding from ACN, an Alaska-based oil spill response organization, so ASLC can further develop oiled marine mammal response protocols and acquire specialized response resources. In addition, the new program involves opportunities to train, exercise and drill with ACN responders, including ACN partners in local communities, and to support remote ASLC specialized veterinarians and technicians in the oil spill response environment.

Along with ACN partnering with the Alaska SeaLife Center, ACN also has a long-standing partnership with International Bird Rescue (IBR). IBR assisted ACN in developing a response trailer designed for rapid mobilization and care of injured birds and small mammals. Like ASLC, IBR also provides bird care professionals and support equipment to assist in the rehabilitation of oiled wildlife.

Criticisms
 In 2011, the Gloucester Daily Times expressed concern that Ocean Conservancy worked too closely with the National Oceanic and Atmospheric Administration on policies that weaken the fishing industry.
 In 2012, a representative for Louisiana governor Bobby Jindal said that clean-up proposals in response to the 2010 BP oil spill, outlined in a report sponsored by the Ocean Conservancy, as well as Environmental Defense Fund, the National Audubon Society, the Nature Conservancy, Oxfam and the National Wildlife Federation, were "out of touch".
In 2015, a group of over 200 environmental leaders and organizations sent an open letter and a technical critique of Ocean Conservancy's "Stemming the Tide" report, also released in 2015. The criticism centered on Ocean Conservancy's advocacy for incineration, which the letter writes can cause harmful effects, the damaging cost waste would have on the Asian cities that the report proposed to store waste nearby, and the acceptance of the necessity of plastics.

See also 

Sustainability
Biodiversity
Global warming
Ecology
Earth Science
Natural environment
Nature
Conservation Movement

References

External links

 25 June 2007 United States Government Takes Important Step in Protecting Critically Endangered North Atlantic Right Whales in the Southeast
 22 June 2007 NOAA Releases Report to Congress on the Status of U.S. Fisheries; Fish Stocks Remain Depleted Due to Overfishing
 11 June 2007 Endangered Sea Turtles Receive Vital Protection
 25 March 2007 New Study Shows that Catch Shares Can Help Achieve Sustainable American Fisheries

Conservation and environmental foundations in the United States
Privately held companies based in Washington, D.C.
Fisheries conservation organizations
Marine conservation organizations